Persatuan Sepakbola Indramayu (simply known as Persindra Indramayu) is an Indonesian football club based in Indramayu Regency, West Java. They currently compete in the Liga 3.

History

Persindra Indramayu was established on 8 October 1966 and is based in Tridaya Stadium, Indramayu Regency, West Java. Persindra has supporters named Pandawa 1966 and Persindra Fans.

In 2022, Persindra coached by Rici Vauzi, won the Liga 3 West Java Series 2 for the first time after defeating Persikas Subang at Sabilulungan Field, Bandung Regency on 23 January 2022. Persindra managed to become champions after winning the match in the penalty shootout with a score of 4–3, after a 0-0 draw in full time.

Honours
 Liga 3 West Java Series 2
 Champion: 2021

References

External links
 Persindra Indramayu Instagram

Indramayu Regency
Football clubs in West Java
Football clubs in Indonesia
Association football clubs established in 1966
1966 establishments in Indonesia